The Men's J. P. Morgan Tournament of Champions 2014 is the men's edition of the 2014 Tournament of Champions, which is a PSA World Series event Gold (prize money: 115 000 $). The event took place at the Grand Central Terminal in New York City in the United States from 17 January to 24 January. Amr Shabana won his third Tournament of Champions trophy, beating Grégory Gaultier in the final.

Prize money and ranking points
For 2014, the prize purse was $115,000. The prize money and points breakdown is as follows:

Seeds

Draw and results

See also
PSA World Tour 2014
Women's Tournament of Champions 2014
Tournament of Champions (squash)

References

External links
PSA Tournament of Champions 2014 website
Tournament of Champions 2014 official website

Tournament of Champions
Tournament of Champions
Tournament of Champions
Tournament of Champions (squash)